The Pusher is a 1960 American crime film directed and co-produced by Gene Milford and written by Harold Robbins. The film stars Kathy Carlyle, Robert Lansing, Felice Orlandi, Douglas Rodgers and Sloan Simpson. The film was released in February 1960, by United Artists.

Plot
A detective investigating the murder of a heroin addict discovers that there is a connection between the junkie and his fiance, who is his boss' daughter.

Cast 
Kathy Carlyle as Laura
Robert Lansing as Steve Carella
Felice Orlandi as The Pusher
Douglas Rodgers as Lt. Peter Byrne
Sloan Simpson as Harriet Byrne
Sara Amman as María Hernández
Jim Boles as Newspaper vendor
John Astin as Detective 
Beatrice Pons as Mrs. Hernandez 
Ernesto Gonzales as Ernesto 
John Fostini as Harry 
David Ford as Detective Kling 
William Doerner as Patrolman Genero
Antonio Obregon as Shoeshine boy 
Jeno Mate as Bartender 
Lee Jones as Young man
Donna Maran as Gert 
Joanna Merlin as Shoeshine boy's mother

References

External links 
 

1960 films
United Artists films
American crime films
1960 crime films
Films based on novels by Ed McBain
American neo-noir films
1960s English-language films
1960s American films